The Bakau United Football Club is a football club from Bakau in the West African, state of Gambia, located near the capital of Banjul. They play in the GFA League First Division, which is the highest league in Gambian football. They won the Gambian Cup in 2005.

Stadium
Currently the team plays at the 5,000 capacity Serrekunda East mini-stadium.

Achievements
Gambian Cup: 1
 2005.

Gambian Super Cup: 1
 2005.

References

External links
Soccerway

Football clubs in the Gambia